Javier Bellido Plaza (born 9 March 1966) is a Spanish former footballer who played as a central defender.

He played 353 matches in Segunda División over 11 seasons (24 goals) in representation of four teams, also appearing for Compostela in La Liga.

Club career
Bellido was born in Bilbao, Biscay. A product of Athletic Bilbao's famous Lezama youth academy, he spent the majority of his career at SD Compostela, where he earned the nickname 'The wall of San Lázaro'. Previously, he played five seasons in the second division with Bilbao Athletic (two years), SD Eibar and Elche CF (two), and started his ten-year spell with the Galicians in the same league.

In the 1997–98 campaign, in spite of Compos' relegation from La Liga after four years, Bellido scored seven league goals, second-best in the squad. He retired in June 2001 at the age of 35, after the team's relegation to the third tier.

Subsequently, Bellido worked as youth system coordinator at his main club. He left his post on 18 June 2017.

References

External links

1966 births
Living people
Spanish footballers
Footballers from Bilbao
Association football defenders
La Liga players
Segunda División players
Tercera División players
SD Amorebieta footballers
Bilbao Athletic footballers
SD Eibar footballers
Elche CF players
SD Compostela footballers